Clupea is genus of planktivorous bony fish belonging to the family Clupeidae, commonly known as herrings. They are found in the shallow, temperate waters of the North Pacific and the North Atlantic oceans, including the Baltic Sea. Two main species of Clupea are currently recognized: the Atlantic herring (Clupea harengus) and the Pacific herring (Clupea pallasii), which have each been divided into subspecies. Herrings are forage fish moving in vast schools, coming in spring to the shores of Europe and America, where they form important commercial fisheries.

Morphology 
The species of Clupea belong to the larger family Clupeidae (herrings, shads, sardines, menhadens), which comprises some 200 species that share similar features. They are silvery-colored fish that have a single dorsal fin, which is soft, without spines. They have no lateral line and have a protruding lower jaw.

Species

Ecology
See Atlantic herring for videos of juvenile herring feeding by catching copepods.

Predators of herring include humans, seabirds, dolphins, porpoises, striped bass, seals, sea lions, whales, sharks, dog fish, tuna, cod, salmon, and halibut. Other large fish also feed on adult herring.

Young herring feed on phytoplankton and as they mature they start to consume larger organisms. Adult herring feed on zooplankton, tiny animals that are found in oceanic surface waters, and small fish and fish larvae. Copepods and other tiny crustaceans are the most common zooplankton eaten by herring. During daylight herring stay in the safety of deep water, feeding at the surface only at night when there is less chance of being seen by predators. They swim along with their mouths open, filtering the plankton from the water as it passes through their gills.

Fisheries

Adult herring are harvested for their meat and eggs, and they are often used as baitfish. The trade in herring is an important sector of many national economies. In Europe the fish has been called the "silver of the sea", and its trade has been so significant to many countries that it has been regarded as the most commercially important fishery in history. Environmental Defense have suggested that the Atlantic herring (Clupea harengus) fishery is one of the more environmentally responsible fisheries.

Sources 

 
 O'Clair, Rita M. and O'Clair, Charles E., "Pacific herring," Southeast Alaska's Rocky Shores: Animals. pg. 343-346. Plant Press: Auke Bay, Alaska (1998).

References

Clupeinae
Commercial fish
Marine fish genera
Taxa named by Carl Linnaeus